Cheddar Valley may refer to:
 the area surrounding the village of Cheddar in Somerset, England
 a brand name of cider produced by Thatchers Cider
 Cheddar Valley line, a former railway line of the area.